The black-and-white bulbul (Microtarsus melanoleucos) is a species of songbird in the bulbul family, Pycnonotidae.
It is found on the Malay Peninsula, Sumatra, and Borneo.
Its natural habitats are subtropical or tropical moist lowland forest and subtropical or tropical moist montane forest.
It is threatened by habitat loss.

References

black-and-white bulbul
Birds of Malesia
black-and-white bulbul
black-and-white bulbul
Taxonomy articles created by Polbot